Francis Xavier Velarde (1897–1961) was an English architect who practised in Liverpool, Merseyside, England.  He trained at the Liverpool School of Architecture where he later taught. His works are mainly in Merseyside and Northwest England, with the major part of his body of output being Catholic churches.  Although Pollard and Pevsner state that he "worked exclusively for the Roman Catholic Church", he did design one Anglican church, St Gabriel's Church, Blackburn. Velarde also designed Roman Catholic schools. This list includes some of his major works.

Key

Works

References
Citations

Sources

 

Velarde, F. X.